Knut Jørgen Røed Ødegaard (born 6 May 1966) is a Norwegian astronomer formerly employed as a media contact at the University of Oslo's Institute of Theoretical Astrophysics. He was the leader of the Norwegian Astronomical Society (2005–2008), and is also manager of the Harestua Solar Observatory.

His enthusiasm for astronomy has made him a popular interview object in Norwegian media for events such as the 2004 Transit of Venus and the 2005 landing of the Huygens probe on Titan, and for astronomy in general towards the general population.

References
 

1966 births
Living people
20th-century astronomers
21st-century astronomers
Norwegian astrophysicists
Norwegian science writers
Academic staff of the University of Oslo
People from Oppland